Christopher Martin may refer to:

Music
Christopher Martin (rapper) (born 1962), American rapper, known as Play, from the duo Kid 'n Play
Christopher Martin (singer) (born 1987), reggae singer/songwriter from Jamaica
Christopher Martin (trumpeter), American trumpet player
DJ Premier (Christopher Martin, born 1966), American DJ and record producer

Others
Christopher Martin (bobsleigh) (born 1945), Canadian Olympic bobsledder
Christopher Martin (Mayflower passenger) (c. 1582–1620/21), English pilgrim on The Mayflower
Christopher C. Martin, American architect
Christopher H. Martin (born 1969), American abstract artist

See also
Christopher Martin-Jenkins (1945–2013), cricket journalist
Christopher Martin Peña (born 1986), Mexican American boxer
Chris Martin (disambiguation)
Christy Martin (disambiguation)
Christian Martin (disambiguation)
Christina Martin (born 1980), comedian
Christopher Martins Pereira (born 1997), Luxembourgian footballer